Ancient Spirit Rising is the fifth album by Domine. It was recorded in January 2007 and released under Japanese label Avalon in February 2007.

Track listing
All tracks by Enrico Paoli except where noted.

 "The Messenger" – 6:24
 "Tempest Calling" – 5:59
 "The Lady of Shalott" – 9:14 
 "Stand Alone (After the Fall)" – 4:28
 "Ancient Spirit Rising" – 9:22	
 "On the Wings of the Firebird" – 6:32
 "Another Time, Another Place, Another Space" (Riccardo Iacono, Paoli) – 7:10
 "Sky Rider" – 4:56
 "How the Mighty Have Fallen" – 7:42

Personnel 
 Morby – vocals
 Enrico Paoli – guitars
 Riccardo Paoli – bass
 Riccardo Iacono – keyboards
 Stefano Bonini – drums

References

External links
 

2007 albums
Domine albums